Scutellaria is a genus of flowering plants in the mint family, Lamiaceae. They are known commonly as skullcaps. The generic name is derived from the Latin scutella, meaning "a small dish, tray or platter", or "little dish", referring to the shape of the calyx. The common name alludes to the resemblance of the same structure to "miniature medieval helmets". The genus has a subcosmopolitan distribution, with species occurring nearly worldwide, mainly in temperate regions.

Description
Some Scutellaria are aquatic. Scutellaria have four-angled stems and opposite leaves, and flowers with upper and lower lips. The genus is most easily recognized by the typical shield on the calyx that has also prompted its common name.

Traditional use
Skullcaps are used in traditional medicine, such as in traditional Chinese medicine. The root of Scutellaria baicalensis  a common component of many preparations   is marketed in volumes that have led to the overexploitation of the wild plant. Its rarity has led to an increase in price, and encouraged the adulteration of the product with other species of Scutellaria.

In 1773, Scutellaria lateriflora became a common treatment in North America for the hysteria and hydrophobia caused by rabies. Today it is still a popular medicinal herb. It is widely available as a commercial product used in western herbalism. The plant reportedly commands prices of $16 to $64 per pound dry weight.

Constituents
The main compounds in skullcap are flavonoids. Isolated chemical compounds include wogonin, wogonoside, and 3,5,7,2',6'-pentahydroxyl flavanone found in Scutellaria. Other constituents include baicalin, apigenin, oroxylin A, and scutellarein.

Selected species

Estimates of the number of species in the genus range from around 300 to about 350 or 360 to 470.

Selected species include:

Scutellaria alabamensis – Alabama skullcap
Scutellaria albida
Scutellaria alborosea Lem.
Scutellaria alpina L. – alpine skullcap
Scutellaria altamaha – pineland skullcap
Scutellaria altissima L. – Somerset skullcap, tall skullcap
Scutellaria amoena
Scutellaria anatolica
Scutellaria angustifolia – narrowleaf skullcap
Scutellaria antirrhinoides Benth. – nose skullcap
Scutellaria arenicola – Florida scrub skullcap
Scutellaria arguta – Blue Ridge skullcap
Scutellaria atriplicifolia
Scutellaria aurata
Scutellaria baicalensis Georgi – Baikal skullcap, Chinese skullcap
Scutellaria barbata D.Don – barbed skullcap
Scutellaria bolanderi A.Gray – Sierra skullcap
Scutellaria brachyspica 
Scutellaria brittonii – Britton's skullcap
Scutellaria bushii – Bush's skullcap
Scutellaria caerulea – blue skullcap
Scutellaria californica A.Gray – California skullcap
Scutellaria cardiophylla – gulf skullcap
Scutellaria columnae
Scutellaria costaricana H.Wendl. – scarlet skullcap, Costa Rican skullcap
Scutellaria drummondii – Drummond's skullcap
Scutellaria elliptica Muhl. – hairy skullcap
Scutellaria floridana Chapm. – Florida skullcap
Scutellaria formosana
Scutellaria galericulata L. – common skullcap, marsh skullcap
Scutellaria glabriuscula – Georgia skullcap
Scutellaria hastifolia – spear-leaved skullcap
Scutellaria havanensis – Havana skullcap
Scutellaria hirta
Scutellaria hookeri
Scutellaria humilis
Scutellaria incana Biehler – downy skullcap, hoary skullcap
Scutellaria incarnata Vent.
Scutellaria indica L.
Scutellaria integrifolia L. – helmet flower
Scutellaria laevis – Culberson County skullcap
Scutellaria lateriflora L. – blue skullcap, Virginian skullcap
Scutellaria longifolia Benth.
Scutellaria longituba
Scutellaria meehanioides
Scutellaria mexicana
Scutellaria microphylla – littleleaf skullcap
Scutellaria minor Huds. – lesser skullcap
Scutellaria montana Chapm. – mountain skullcap, large-flowered skullcap
Scutellaria multiglandulosa – Small's skullcap
Scutellaria muriculata – Rio Grande skullcap
Scutellaria nana A.Gray – dwarf skullcap
Scutellaria nervosa – veiny skullcap
Scutellaria novae-zelandaie 
Scutellaria ocmulgee – Ocmulgee skullcap
Scutellaria orientalis
Scutellaria ovata Hill – heart-leaved skullcap
Scutellaria parvula Michx. – small skullcap
Scutellaria pekinensis
Scutellaria potosina – Mexican skullcap
Scutellaria pseudoserrata – falseteeth skullcap
Scutellaria purpurascens
Scutellaria racemosa – South American skullcap
Scutellaria rehderiana
Scutellaria resinosa Torr. – sticky skullcap
Scutellaria rubicunda
Scutellaria sapphirina – White Pine skullcap
Scutellaria sarmentosa
Scutellaria saxatilis – smooth rock skullcap
Scutellaria serboana
Scutellaria serrata – showy skullcap
Scutellaria siphocampyloides – grayleaf skullcap
Scutellaria splendens
Scutellaria strigillosa
Scutellaria suffrutescens
Scutellaria texana – Texas skullcap
Scutellaria thieretii – Thieret's skullcap
Scutellaria tuberosa Benth. – Danny's skullcap
Scutellaria utriculata
Scutellaria ventenatii
Scutellaria violacea
Scutellaria viscidula
Scutellaria wrightii – Wright's skullcap

See also
Piper methysticum
Valeriana officinalis (valerian)
Chaenomeles speciosa

References

External links

Scutellaria images. MorphBank.

 
Lamiaceae genera
Medicinal plants
Anxiolytics
Dopamine reuptake inhibitors
GABAA receptor positive allosteric modulators
Taxa named by Carl Linnaeus